Tom Carroll was an Irish sportsperson in the 1880s.  A native of Moyne, County Tipperary, he played hurling with his local Thurles Blues club and was a member of the Tipperary senior inter-county team that won the very first All-Ireland title in 1887.

Teams

Thurles Sarsfields hurlers
Tipperary inter-county hurlers
All-Ireland Senior Hurling Championship winners
Year of birth missing
Year of death missing